César Mauricio Velásquez Ossa  was the Ambassador of Colombia to the Holy See as of 2010. He had previously served as Press Secretary for President Álvaro Uribe Vélez from 2007 to 2010.

Selected works

References

People from Medellín
Colombian Roman Catholics
Colombian journalists
Male journalists
Press Secretaries of Colombia
Ambassadors of Colombia to the Holy See
Living people
Year of birth missing (living people)